The American Association of Petroleum Geologists (AAPG) is one of the world's largest professional geological societies with more than 40,000 members across 129 countries as of 2021. The AAPG works to "advance the science of geology, especially as it relates to petroleum, natural gas, other subsurface fluids, and mineral resources; to promote the technology of exploring for, finding, and producing these materials in an economically and environmentally sound manner; and to advance the professional well-being of its members." The AAPG was founded in 1917 and is headquartered in Tulsa, Oklahoma; currently almost one-third of its members live outside the United States.

Over the years, the activities of the AAPG have broadened so that they bring together not just geology but also geophysics, geochemistry, engineering, and innovative analytics to enable the more efficient and environmentally-friendly approaches to the development of all earth-based energy sources. New transformative technologies, such as the ability to better characterize reservoirs through imaging and the integration of multiple data sources, are coupled with concerns about the environment. Members and affiliated societies are very much involved in preserving the quality of groundwater, dealing responsibly with produced water, and understanding the mechanisms of induced seismicity. In addition to subsurface investigations, the society supports mapping of the surface and the use of new technologies (UAVs, drones, big data analytics), with the goals of advancing the science and understanding of geological processes.

AAPG publishes the AAPG Explorer magazine and AAPG Bulletin scientific journal, and co-publishes a scientific journal with the Society of Exploration Geophysicists called Interpretation. The organization holds an annual meeting including a technical conference and exhibition, sponsors other conferences and continuing education for members around the world such as ongoing Geosciences Technology Workshops, and provides various other services to its members. The organization also includes divisions focused on particular aspects of the profession.  These include the Division of Environmental Geosciences, Division of Professional Affairs, and the Energy and Minerals Division. The association membership has included Harrison "Jack" Schmitt, a U.S. astronaut who walked on the moon.

Awards
At its annual conventions and international conferences AAPG recognizes the distinguished contributions in the field of petroleum geosciences with various awards, including the Sidney Powers Memorial Award, Michel T. Halbouty Outstanding Leadership Award, Grover E. Murray Memorial Distinguished Educator Award, Wallace Pratt Memorial Award, and Ziad Rafiq Beydoun Memorial Award. The AAPG IBA award is given immediately following the IBA competition that is held at that year's annual convention.

AAPG IBA (Imperial Barrel Award)
AAPG promotes student involvement in the profession by holding an annual Imperial Barrel Award competition where geoscience graduate students are encouraged to explore a career in the energy industry. In this global competition, university teams analyze a dataset (geology, geophysics, land, production infrastructure, and other relevant materials) and deliver their results in a 25-minute presentation. The students' presentations are judged by industry experts, providing the students a real-world, career-development experience.

IBA offers students and their faculty advisor a chance to win accolades for themselves and cash prizes for their schools, and winning teams travel free to the annual AAPG convention to network with both future colleagues and future employers.

Correlation of Stratigraphic Units of North America
The Correlation of Stratigraphic Units of North America (COSUNA) was a project of the AAPG which resulted in the publication of sixteen correlation charts depicting modern concepts of the stratigraphy of North America.

Pioneering positions

The AAPG has supported the investigation of the earth, and over the years, ideas about how oil is formed have changed. In the 1960s, the AAPG supported the then-revolutionary idea of plate tectonics (vs. isostasy), and looked at plate tectonics as a key to the evolution of basins, and thus the formation of oil and gas. An example is Tanya Atwater's work on plate tectonics. As a whole, women geoscientists have played an important role in the AAPG's 100-year history as scientists and leaders.

Since that time, the AAPG has worked closely with scientific organizations such as the USGS to apply new scientific breakthroughs to the generation, migration, and entrapment of oil and gas. The results have brought new understanding of ultra-deepwater reservoirs (such as off the coast of Brazil). Further understanding about kerogen typing and natural fracture development led to a better understanding of shale resources, and contributed to the "shale revolution." In addition, the AAPG has looked closely at the role of independent oil companies in the roll-out of new technologies used in new types of plays such as shales.

The AAPG has supported geomechanics in order to be able to predict pore pressure and avoid drilling hazards.  The AAPG has also been supportive of investigations having to do with the impact of policies of disposing of produced water by injecting it into deep formations. Workshops and forums have been held since 2009 (Geosciences Technology Workshops) to analyze the problems and to discuss solutions.  They have been held throughout the world, and are documented through the presentations. The presentations from the workshops have been made available for free via the AAPG's open access online journal, Search and Discovery.

Global warming controversy

In 2006, the AAPG was criticized for selecting author Michael Crichton for their Journalism Award for Jurassic Park and "for his recent science-based thriller State of Fear", in which Crichton exposed his rejection of scientific evidence for anthropogenic global warming. Daniel P. Schrag, a geochemist who directs the Harvard University Center for the Environment, called the award "a total embarrassment" that he said "reflects the politics of the oil industry and a lack of professionalism" on the association's part. The AAPG's award for journalism lauded "notable journalistic achievement, in any medium, which contributes to public understanding of geology, energy resources or the technology of oil and gas exploration." The name of the journalism award has since been changed to the "Geosciences in the Media" Award.

The criticism drew attention to the AAPG's 1999 position statement formally rejecting the likelihood of human influence on recent climate.  The Council of the American Quaternary Association wrote in a criticism of the award that the "AAPG stands alone among scientific societies in its denial of human-induced effects on global warming."

As recently as March 2007, articles in the newsletter of the AAPG Division of Professional Affairs stated that "the data does not support human activity as the cause of global warming" and characterize the Intergovernmental Panel on Climate Change reports as "wildly distorted and politicized."

2007 AAPG revised position
Acknowledging that the association's previous policy statement on Climate Change was "not supported by a significant number of our members and prospective members", AAPG's formal stance was reviewed and changed in July 2007.

The new statement formally accepts human activity as at least one contributor to carbon dioxide increase, but does not confirm its link to climate change, saying its members are "divided on the degree of influence that anthropogenic CO2 has" on climate. AAPG also stated support for "research to narrow probabilistic ranges on the effect of anthropogenic CO2 on global climate."

AAPG also withdrew its earlier criticism of other scientific organizations and research stating, "Certain climate simulation models predict that the warming trend will continue, as reported through NAS, AGU, AAAS, and AMS. AAPG respects these scientific opinions but wants to add that the current climate warming projections could fall within well-documented natural variations in past climate and observed temperature data. These data do not necessarily support the maximum case scenarios forecast in some models."

Affiliated organizations
Organizations may request affiliation with AAPG if they meet a set of criteria including goals compatible with those of AAPG; membership of at least 60% professional geologists with degrees; dissemination of scientific information through publications or meetings; and membership not restricted by region.
Pittsburgh Association of Petroleum Geologists 
Pittsburgh Geological Society
Canadian Society of Petroleum Geologists
Pacific Section of AAPG (PSAAPG)

See also
Betty Ann Elliott
Fred Meissner
List of geoscience organizations
Society of Exploration Geophysicists
Society of Petroleum Engineers
Denise M. Stone

References

External links
Official website

Economic geology
Geology societies
Petroleum in the United States
Scientific societies based in the United States
Organizations based in Oklahoma
Organizations established in 1907